John Martin Alfsen , known more commonly as John Alfsen (December23, 1902November 30, 1971) was a painter, known for his portraits, figurative work and paintings of circus life.

Biography
John Martin Alfsen, born in Michigan, immigrated to Canada in 1913 as a boy of 11 and settled in Toronto. He studied at the Ontario College of Art with Arthur Lismer, F. H. Varley and J.W. Beatty (1920–1922), then at the Academy of Fine Arts, Antwerp, and sculpture with Antoine Bourdelle at the Académie de la Grande Chaumière, Paris. Following his year in Europe, he took further study at the Art Students' League, NYC, under Kenneth Hayes Miller (1925). He taught at the Ontario College of Art from 1926 to 1971. For two years, he lived in Sarasota where he taught and painted winter circus people at the Ringling Brothers School of Art. An award was established in his memory at the College in 1986.

His work was featured in an exhibition with Randolph Hewton in 1943 at the then Art Gallery of Toronto, at the Kitchener-Waterloo Art Gallery, Kitchener, Ontario (1958) and recently, in the exhibition Drawn to Dance with York Wilson and Canadian artist Grant Macdonald in 2016 at the DCD Gallery, Toronto.

His works are in public collections such as the National Gallery of Canada, the Art Gallery of Ontario, the Beaverbrook Art Gallery, and the University College Collection of the Art Museum, University of Toronto. Clown Alley in the collection of the Art Gallery of Ontario was painted when the artist was spending the winter with the Ringling Brothers School of Art in Florida. His work can be seen at Alfsen House, 154 Main St. North, Markham, Ontario.
 
Alfsen was a member of the Royal Canadian Academy of Arts (1959), the Ontario Society of Artists (1939); the Canadian Group of Painters and the Canadian Society of Graphic Art (1956).

References

1902 births
1971 deaths
OCAD University alumni
Academic staff of OCAD University
20th-century Canadian painters
Canadian male painters
Members of the Royal Canadian Academy of Arts
American emigrants to Canada
20th-century Canadian male artists